The Industry Act 1972 was an Act of the British Parliament passed by Edward Heath's Conservative government.

Background

The Act, in the words of Treasury civil servant Leo Pliatzky, was intended to "strengthen our industrial capacity so as to take advantage of membership of the Common Market" which Britain would join in 1973.

The framework of the Act was designed by a committee chaired by civil servant William Armstrong in secrecy.

Contents

The Act set up two types of state assistance to industry, general and specific. The first type of assistance in the Act consisted of free depreciation on new plant and machinery worth up to 100% capital allowance and the revival of regional state investment grants in regions with high unemployment. This was divided into four categories: Special Development Areas, Development Areas, Intermediate Areas and Derelict Land Clearance Areas. This provided assistance to nearly the whole country outside the South East. The Act also founded the Industrial Development Executive to give selective assistance to individual companies.

In order to help the Department of Trade and Industry control prices, the Act set up the Office of Fair Trading and the Consumer Protection Advisory Committee. This in effect revived the Consumer Council which the Conservatives had abolished two years previously.

Reaction

Heath had been elected on a free market manifesto in 1970 and when the Act's contents were published it was (according to Pliatzky) a "very great shock to some of the other members of the government, and some of those who were most committed to the market economy philosophy were really quite taken aback by the whole thing".

In May The Times reported that Conservative backbenchers expressed opposition to Clause 7 of the Act that provided state aid to the assisted areas because it "ran counter to all previous Conservative declarations" and because "it paid no regard to the economic viability of any company assisted". It was also reported that some (unnamed) Cabinet ministers were uneasy with the "socialist implications of the Bill" and that one had called it the "Lame Ducks (Unlimited) Bill".

However, there were no Cabinet resignations and it passed Second Reading in the House of Commons on 22 May without division, being supported by the Labour Party. Most Conservative MPs who spoke in the debate welcomed the Act. However, Jock Bruce-Gardyne warned that "we are on a slippery slope once we start providing individual industries with inflation subsidies" but he was unable to find another MP to second him in order to force a vote.

Only two Conservatives voted against it in Committee stage (John Biffen and Thomas Normanton). An amendment that subsidies worth more than £1 million should be laid before the Commons was supported by Biffen, Normanton, Bruce-Gardyne, Trevor Skeet and the Liberal MP John Pardoe but it was heavily defeated. However, the Chairman of the 1922 Committee, Sir Henry Legge-Bourke, warned the government in July that there was considerable opposition amongst distinguished and older party members because it was "a Socialist Bill by ethic and philosophy...obnoxious for many reasons". The government therefore amended it by limiting to £5 million the amount that could be given as a subsidy without needing the express approval of Parliament. It passed Third Reading without debate.

The Labour MP Tony Benn welcomed the Act, praising it in an article titled "Heath's spadework for socialism":

[The Act is the] most comprehensive armoury of government control that has ever been assembled for use over private industry, far exceeding all the powers thought necessary by the last Labour government...Heath has performed a very important historical role in preparing for the fundamental and irreversible transfer in the balance of power and wealth which has to take place.

In the Commons Benn claimed that "We shall make use of the powers of the Bill, when we inherit power again, more radically than the right hon. Gentleman himself will use them".

Notes

United Kingdom Acts of Parliament 1972